Boruch is a given name. Notable people with the name include:

Boruch Ber Leibowitz, main student of Rabbi Chaim Brisker famed for his Talmudic lectures
Boruch Greenfeld, (1872–1956), rabbi and Torah scholar
Boruch Israel Dyner (1903–1979), Belgian–Israeli chess master
Boruch of Medzhybizh (1753–1811), the first major "rebbe" of the Hasidic movement to hold court in Mezhbizh and Beis Medrash
Marianne Boruch (born 1950), American poet